Ana Gabriela Wolfermann (born Caracas, Venezuela, on March 20, 2001) is a Venezuelan-American actress, host, singer, and content creator. She is known for her role as Rosie Rivera on Telemundo's Netflix series Mariposa de Barrio and for her rising social media presence through her TikTok account.

She has lived in Miami, Florida since her family immigrated to the United States in 2008.

Education 
Ana Wolfermann graduated from Coral Gables Senior High School in Miami, Florida in 2019 with a Bilingual International Baccalaureate Diploma.  Then she went on to study film, television, and theatre at the University of Notre Dame, where she is currently a fourth year student pursuing a Bachelor of Arts Degree.

Career 
At 14 years old, she made her debut in Telemundo's television series, Bajo el Mismo Cielo. She played the young version of Adela Morales (protagonist). In 2016, Wolfermann portrayed Sara Aguilar in television series Eva La Trailera where she shared scenes with Edith Gonzales and Javier Díaz Dueñas.

For 2017, she was chosen in the main cast of television series Mariposa de Barrio, now streaming on Netflix internationally. She portrayed teenage Rosie Rivera from the ages of 12–17, sister of the famous Mexican singer Jenni Rivera, and shared scenes with actors such as Angelica Celaya, Samadhi Zendejas and Gabriel Porras. In a Telemundo live digital interview in 2018, Wolfermann explained that the role of Rosie Rivera allowed her to truly develop her talent at 15 years old, as she was challenged with interpreting scenes of complex psychological trauma, rebellion, fights, sexual abuse, and drug and alcohol consumption.

Also, she was part of the main cast in the episode of "El Milagro del Niño Diego" in Telemundo's mini series Milagros de Navidad. She played Gabriela Johnson and shared scenes with Litzy Dominguez, who played her mother.

In 2018, Wolfermann played Sandy Ryan in Telemundo's television series Mi Familia Perfecta. She shared scenes with actors such as Gala Montes, Jorge Luis Moreno, Sabrian Seara and Paulina Matos.

In 2021, Wolfermann was cast in the Disney Plus Gina Yei, as Ruby Rubí, a character that lead Wolfermann to record her first songs with Walt Disney Records as part of her role. Her songs "La Queen" and "Mucho para ti bebé" were written by Daniel Alberto Espinoza, José Sabino, Omar Luis Sabino, Somos Productions and Vladimir Perez.

Other Work

Theatre 
In 2019, Wolfermann played the lead role of Felicia Alvarado in Anne García-Romero's, Staging the Daffy Dame, production at the University of Notre Dame, directed by Kevin Dreyer.

Content Creation 
In 2020, when the pandemic began, Wolfermann began to create videos on TikTok. On her social media she shares her college lifestyle videos, her personal goals, advice to young girls, and her fashion interests, while focusing on promoting positivity, creativity and love.

Podcast 
In the summer of 2022, Wolfermann launched her first episode of a podcast called Creating Happiness, a weekly conversation about life as a college student, personal growth, accomplishing goals, living with gratitude, cultivating relationships, and taking control of your own happiness.

Host 
Beginning her junior year at the University of Notre Dame, Wolfermann was selected to work for Fighting Irish Media as the university's athletic host at football, basketball, and volleyball games.

Recognitions 
In 2021, she was awarded best local Tik Toker in Miami Magazine.

Filmography

References

External links 
 
 

2001 births
Living people
Venezuelan people of German descent
Venezuelan expatriates in the United States
21st-century American actresses
American television actresses
American TikTokers
American women podcasters